Thomas Walsingham (c. 1526 – 15 January 1584) was an English politician.

He was the only surviving son of Sir Edmund Walsingham of Scadbury, Lieutenant of the Tower and was trained in the law at Lincoln's Inn in 1542. He succeeded his father in 1550 and was knighted in 1573.

He was described as a "country gentleman", and was a significant landowner. As well as his main estates near Chislehurst, he had property in Cambridgeshire, Essex, Surrey and London. He was a Justice of the Peace for Kent from around 1559 and was appointed High Sheriff of Kent for 1563–64. He was a Member of Parliament (MP) for Maidstone in 1571.

He married Dorothy Guildford, the daughter of Sir John Guildford of Benenden, and had 5 sons and 8 daughters, including Mary Walsingham who married Sir Thomas Pelham (1550-1624), Anne Walsingham who married Thomas Randolph (1523-1590)(Ambassador) and Thomas Walsingham, the patron of Christopher Marlowe.

References

1526 births
1584 deaths
Members of Lincoln's Inn
English MPs 1571
High Sheriffs of Kent
English justices of the peace
English knights
Knights Bachelor